Julian Hermann (born 26 Mai 2001) is a Swiss footballer who plays as a midfielder for Kriens.

Club career
Hermann is a youth product of his local clubs Ebikon and then Kriens, before joining the academy of Luzern at the age of 17. He started playing for their U21 squad in the Swiss 1. Liga in 2019. He made his professional debut with Luzern in a 0–0 Swiss Super League tie with FC Basel on 3 August 2020.

On 20 July 2021, he moved to Cham in the third-tier Swiss Promotion League.

On 23 June 2022, Hermann returned to his youth club Kriens.

References

External links
 
 SFL Profile

2001 births
Living people
People from Lucerne-Land District
Sportspeople from the canton of Lucerne
Swiss men's footballers
Association football midfielders
FC Luzern players
SC Cham players
SC Kriens players
Swiss 1. Liga (football) players
Swiss Super League players
Swiss Promotion League players